Hinsingen is a commune in the north-western corner of the Bas-Rhin department in Grand Est in north-eastern France.

History
The place is first recorded in 1328 as "Heyngesingen": at that time it was in Saarwerden County.
Originally the little village clustered around its castle was positioned in the valley, but it was destroyed in the Thirty Years War.  Hinsingen is on the frontier between Alsace and Lorraine: following further sustained destruction wrought by the interminable wars fought between France and The Empire in the final decades of the seventeenth century, remaining villagers removed the settlement to its present hilltop location.

The name of the village has mutated over time through "Hinquezange" to "Hinsingen".

See also
 Communes of the Bas-Rhin department

References

Communes of Bas-Rhin
Bas-Rhin communes articles needing translation from French Wikipedia